Monochroa sperata is a moth of the family Gelechiidae. It was described by Peter Huemer and Ole Karsholt in 2010. It is found in the south-western Alps of France and Italy.

References

Moths described in 2010
Monochroa